Christina Sappey  is an American politician serving as a member of the Pennsylvania House of Representatives, representing the 158th district. She is a member of the Democratic Party.

Political career
Sappey worked as an aide to several Pennsylvania state legislators and served as the chief of staff to Carolyn Comitta and Barbara McIlvane Smith. Sappey currently sits on the Agriculture & Rural Affairs,

Local Government,  and Veterans Affairs & Emergency Preparedness committees.

Pennsylvania House of Representatives

2018 election 
Sappey announced her candidacy for the Pennsylvania House of Representatives's 158th district in February 2018 and defeated Chris Nelms in the Democratic primary. Sappey won the general election, unseating one-term incumbent Eric Roe, garnering 15,301 votes to Roe's 13,607.

2020 election 
On November 15, 2019, Roe announced he would seek a re-match against Sappey to regain his former seat. Both Roe and Sappey were unopposed in their respective primaries. Sappey defeated Roe by a margin of 485 votes.

References

External links
PA House website bio
Democratic Caucus bio

Living people
Women state legislators in Pennsylvania
Democratic Party members of the Pennsylvania House of Representatives
21st-century American politicians
21st-century American women politicians
1962 births
Politicians from Chester County, Pennsylvania